Penncrest School District is a midsized public school district located primarily in Crawford County, in Northwest Pennsylvania, with a small portion of the district's service area in adjacent Venango County. The school district encompasses several rural townships and boroughs. Its administrative offices are located in Hayfield Township outside Saegertown, Pennsylvania.  Penncrest School District encompasses approximately 400 square miles. According to 2000 federal census data it serves a resident population of 24,780 people. In 2009, the district residents' per capita income was $16,413, while the median family income was $42,566 a year.

The school district consists of community centered schools: three K-6 elementary schools and three 7–12 high schools.  Its total enrollment is around 3,500 in 2009.

History 

The school district was founded in the 1970s through a merger of the Saegertown, Randolph-East Mead, and Cambridge Springs school systems. The name PENNCREST is derived from the words Pennsylvania, Cambridge Springs, Randolph, East Mead, Saegertown, and Townville.  Its physical plant at one point in time consisted of a total of four K-4 and two K-6 elementary schools, two 5–8 middle schools, two 9–12 high schools, and one 7–12 joint high school. Its plant was reduced to its current composition by the decommissioning of several elementary and middle schools during the 1990s and 2000s.

Schools 
 Cambridge Springs Elementary School
 Cambridge Springs Junior-Senior High School
 Maplewood Elementary School
 Maplewood Junior-Senior High School
 Saegertown Elementary School
 Saegertown Junior-Senior High School

Municipalities 

The following is a list of municipalities served by the PENNCREST School District.

Townships 
 Athens Township
 Cambridge Township
 Cussewago Township
 East Mead Township
 Hayfield Township
 Plum Township
 Randolph Township
 Richmond Township
 Rockdale Township
 Steuben Township
 Troy Township
 Venango Township
 Woodcock Township

Boroughs and CDPs 
 Blooming Valley
 Cambridge Springs
 Guys Mills (census-designated place)
 Saegertown
 Townville
 Venango
 Woodcock

References 

School districts in Crawford County, Pennsylvania
School districts in Venango County, Pennsylvania
School districts established in 1971